Capron is an inactive town in Woods County, Oklahoma, United States. The population was 23 at the 2010 census, declining by almost half from 2000 when it had 42 persons.

Geography
Capron is located at  (36.896307, -98.578351).

Demographics

As of the census of 2000, there were 42 people, 17 households, and 10 families residing in the town. The racial makeup of the town was 100.00% White.

There were 17 households, out of which 23.5% had children under the age of 18 living with them, 58.8% were married couples living together, 5.9% had a female householder with no husband present, and 35.3% were non-families. 29.4% of all households were made up of individuals, and 11.8% had someone living alone who was 65 years of age or older. The average household size was 2.47 and the average family size was 3.18.

In the town, the population was spread out, with 19.0% under the age of 18, 7.1% from 18 to 24, 33.3% from 25 to 44, 28.6% from 45 to 64, and 11.9% who were 65 years of age or older. The median age was 42 years. For every 100 females, there were 133.3 males. For every 100 females age 18 and over, there were 112.5 males.

The median income for a household in the town was $24,250, and the median income for a family was $23,750. Males had a median income of $22,500 versus $16,250 for females. The per capita income for the town was $11,156. None of the population and none of the families were below the poverty line.

History
Prior to the opening of the Cherokee Strip in 1893, Capron, Oklahoma was first known as "Warren", a small cattle station on the main line of the Santa Fe railroad. It consisted of a store, and an old railroad car left by the Santa Fe. Sometime after the opening of the strip residents wanted to come up with a new name for the growing town. The name was changed to "Sterling", but the postal service and Santa Fe would not accept it because there was a town by that name on their line in Kansas. The names of "Virgil" and "Kermit" were proposed, but Santa Fe would not accept these names, for the same reason. Therefore, a committee consisting of Mr. George Espy, postmaster, Dr. G.W. Todd, and Congressman Dennis Flynn was appointed to select a name which the Santa Fe and Postal Service would accept. The name of Captain Allyn K. Capron, Jr. was proposed. Captain Capron was a member of Teddy Roosevelt's Rough Riders, and had been killed at the Battle of San Juan Hill. The name of "Capron" was approved by a petition of the residents. The Santa Fe and U. S. Postal service accepted the name and so it stands today.

At one time Capron was quite a thriving community. It had two banks; the Bank of Capron, and the Capron State Bank; three general stores; two drug stores; a hotel; depot; a millinery shop; theater; blacksmith; a weekly newspaper, The Capron Hustler; a monthly newspaper, The Screech Owl; two barber shops; hardware store; lumber yard; two churches, Warburton Memorial Methodist Church, and First Congregational Church; the Driftwood Telephone Company and Hampton's Foot Powder Factory.

In April 1939 a tornado struck Capron, making a straight line down the main business street. Many of the residents of town did not even know the tornado has struck until the next morning when they went downtown to open their stores and found them gone. Most tornadoes sound like trains, and since a train goes through Capron about every 20 minutes no one noticed! Most of the above businesses, and the public school building, which was only 10 years old, were destroyed. The majority of these businesses were never rebuilt. However, the public schools were rebuilt.

Capron was always concerned with having a good school system. In 1894 a small but enterprising group of Driftwood Township citizens provided for the establishment of the first Capron Public Schools. The school consisted of grades 1–8 and consisted of a two-room frame building located south and east of the present south Coop Grain Elevator. This building proved adequate until 1909 when a new two-story brick building was built in the north end of town at the site of the present school building. The cost of the 1909 building was $8,500.00. In 1929 residents approved the building of a new one-story building with a large gymnasium and auditorium attached. The old two-story building was torn down to make way for this modern facility. This building was destroyed in the 1939 tornado and a new building, auditorium and gymnasium were built in 1940. At the time, this facility was considered to be one of the best schools in northwest Oklahoma. Additions to the present building were made: in 1952, vocational agriculture building; 1956, additional classrooms and music room; and 1964, when a new cafeteria was added to the school. The high school was first accredited in 1912. In 1968 the high school was closed due to falling enrollment. There were no families in the school district on public assistance in 1968, and the patrons of the district never voted down a tax increase for their school; they wanted the very best for their children. The Elementary School, grades K–8 were closed in 1976 by a vote of the patrons which carried by only one vote. The vote was contested. This decision was taken to court and eventually upheld by the Oklahoma Supreme Court. Today Capron has two large concrete grain elevators, a rural water district office, United Methodist Church, garage, filling station, and American Legion Post. The Post Office closed in 1994 after 100 years of service to the citizens of the area.

Notable person
Danny Thompson, professional baseball player

References

External links
 Oklahoma Digital Maps: Digital Collections of Oklahoma and Indian Territory

Towns in Oklahoma
Towns in Woods County, Oklahoma
Populated places disestablished in 2010
Former municipalities in Oklahoma